Claire Hardaker is a British costume designer. She has worked on a number of notable films, including Kick-Ass 2, Prometheus, Dorian Gray, and The Queen.

Professional life 
Claire Hardaker has been an Independent Costume Professional since June 2004, and was also a costumer buyer for Fox UK Productions Limited between 2010 and 2011. Claire Hardaker was also a costume designer for The Pit in 2009.

Selected filmography 
 Da Vinci's Demons (2014)
 Maleficent (2014)
 Kick-Ass 2 (2013) 
 Trance (2013) 
 Prometheus (2012) 
 Blitz (2011) 
 Cemetery Junction (2010) 
 Dorian Gray (2009) 
 The Young Victoria (2009) 
 City of Ember (2008) 
 Flashbacks of a Fool (2008) 
 Capturing Mary (2007) 
 Joe's Palace (2007) 
 The Queen (2006) 
 Dark Corners (2006)

References

External links 
 

British costume designers
Living people
Year of birth missing (living people)